Yolande Villemaire (born 28 August 1949 in Mirabel, Quebec) is a Canadian novelist, short story writer and poet.

She obtained a Bachelor in theater (1970) and a master's degree in letters (1974) from the University of Quebec at Montreal. She worked as an actor, and later became a professor of theatre.  She has published books of poetry and novels since 1974. She won awards for "La vie en prose" (1980) and "La constellation des cygnes" (1985).

She has directed the collection "hieroglyph" in XYZ editor since 1999.

Bibliography

Poetry

 Machine Does Les Herbes rouges, Montreal, 1974
 Whether the blood stage, Cul-Q Publishing, Montreal, 1977
 Terre de mue, Éditions Cul-Q, Montréal, 1978 Earth moved, Cul-Q Publishing, Montreal, 1978
 Hieroglyph side of what is called reality, Les Herbes rouges, Montreal, 1982
 Adrenaline, Chillwind, Montreal, 1982
 The land Coincidences, The Full Moon Hotel, 1983
 Young women always the most beautiful red, urban Lips 8, Montreal, 1984
 Quartz and mica, Les Ecrits des Forges (Quebec) and Castor Astral (France), 1985
 The Indian moon, Les Ecrits des Forges, Trois-Rivieres, 1994
 The walls of fog, The Writings of Forges, Trois-Rivieres, 1997
 Amber and shade, Ecrits des Forges, Trois-Rivieres in 2000 and 2003 (paperback)
 Celeste sadness, Hexagon 1997, The Writings of Forges / Le Temps des Cerises, Trois-Rivières/Pantin, 2006
 The armor, Ecrits des Forges (Quebec) and Phi (Luxembourg), 2009

Novels

 Lynley White, Guerin, 1974, Typo, Montreal 1985
 La Vie en prose, Les Herbes rouges, 1980 Typo Montreal, 1986
 Amazon Angel, Red Grass, Montreal, 1982
 Constellation The Swan, The Full Moon, 1985, Typo, Montreal, 1996
 Vava, The Hexagon, Montreal, 1989
 The God in the Hexagon, Montreal, 1995
 Small red fruits, al. "Hieroglyph" XYZ éditeur, Montreal, 2001
 The wave of Amsterdam, XYZ (Qc) and Le Castor Astral (France), 2003
 Poets and centaurs, XYZ éditeur, Montreal 2005
 India, India, XYZ éditeur, Montreal 2007

In translation

 Quartz & Mica. Trad. Judith Cowen. Guernica, Montreal, 1987
 Amazon Angel. Trad. by Gérald Leblanc, Guernica, Toronto, Canada 1993
 Muros de niebla. Trad. by Silvia Pratt, Mantis Editores, Guadalajara, Mexico, 2003
 Midnight Tides of Amsterdam Trad. by Leonard Sugden, Ekstasis Publishing, Victoria, BC, Canada, 2004
 The Costellazioni del Cigno. Trad. by Osvaldo Lanzolla. WIP Edizioni, Bari, Italy, 2005
 Poets & Centaurs. Trad. by Leonard Sugden. Ekstasis Publishing, Victoria, BC Canada 2006
 Celeste tristeza. Trad. by Gabriel Martin, Literalia Editores, Guadalajara Mexico 2006
 The divinity danzante Trad. by Osvaldo Lanzolla. WIP Edizioni, Bari, Italy 2007
 Little Red Berries. Trad. Leonard Sugden, Ekstasis Publishing, Victoria, BC 2008
 L'onda di Amsterdam.Trad. Lorella Martinelli, Edizioni Scientifiche Italiane, Naples 2009
 India, India. Trad. Leonard Sugden, Ekstasis Publishing, Victoria, BC, 2009
  Quebec 2008, Co-edition Writings Forges (Quebec) and Bag Tags (France), 216 p. ( and ).

Joint collection of poetry in French with 20 authors whose Mongeau France, Yolande Villemaire, Claude Beausoleil, Denise Boucher, Stéphane Despatie, Claudine Bertrand for Quebec and Georges Bonnet, Odile Caradec, Bozi Raymond, Jean-Claude Martin, James Sacré, Josyane Bergey of Jesus for France.

Honors
 1980 - Young Writers Award from the Journal de Montreal, La Vie en prose
 1979 - Award Competition works radio Radio-Canada, Beautiful Night
 1985 - Roman Price, Journal de Montréal, the Cygnus
 1995 - Edgar Award-Lespérance
 1997 - Guest of Honor at the Salon du Livre de Montreal
 1998 - Award-Yves Theriault Radio-Canada, Women of salt
 1998 - Competition News Radio-Canada
 2001 - Prix littéraires Radio-Canada poetry for The armor
 2008 - International Poetry Prize Gatien Lapointe-Jaime Sabines
 2009 - Career Awards Council of Arts and Letters from Quebec

Notes

References
 Yolande Villemaire entry in The Canadian Encyclopedia

20th-century Canadian novelists
20th-century Canadian poets
21st-century Canadian novelists
21st-century Canadian poets
Canadian women poets
Canadian poets in French
Canadian women novelists
People from Mirabel, Quebec
Writers from Quebec
Living people
Université du Québec à Montréal alumni
20th-century Canadian women writers
21st-century Canadian women writers
Canadian novelists in French
1949 births